Sparganothoides broccusana is a species of moth of the family Tortricidae. It is found in the mountains of Jalisco and Sinaloa in western Mexico.

The length of the forewings is 7–9.3 mm for males and about 8.6 mm for females. The ground colour of the forewings is brownish yellow or golden yellow to brownish grey, with scattered orange and brown scaling. The hindwings are pale grey. Adults have been recorded on wing in April, July and August, probably in two generations per year.

Etymology
The species name refers to the protuberances on the head and is derived from Latin brochus (meaning projecting teeth).

References

Moths described in 2009
Sparganothoides